Aleksey Aleksandrovich Korneyev (February 6, 1939December 14, 2004) was a Russian footballer.

Honours
 Soviet Top League winner: 1962.
 Soviet Cup winner: 1963, 1965.

International career
He earned 6 caps for the USSR national football team, and participated in the 1964 European Nations' Cup, where the Soviets were the runners-up, and the 1966 FIFA World Cup, where the Soviets finished fourth.

External links
Profile (in Russian)

1939 births
2004 deaths
Russian footballers
Soviet footballers
Soviet Union international footballers
1964 European Nations' Cup players
1966 FIFA World Cup players
FC Spartak Moscow players
FC Shinnik Yaroslavl players
Soviet Top League players
Association football midfielders
Association football defenders